Głuszyna  is a village in the administrative district of Gmina Namysłów, within Namysłów County, Opole Voivodeship, in southern Poland.

The name of the village is of Polish origin and comes from the word głuszec, which means "capercaillie".

References

Villages in Namysłów County